Kwaku Bediako (born 7 May 1986) is a Ghanaian contemporary fashion designer and founder of Chocolate Clothing.

Early life and education 
Kwaku attended University of Ghana Primary School Legon, then proceeded to Mfantsipim School in Cape Coast before entering Achimota School for a year. He furthered his education in University of Ghana where he obtained a Bachelor of Arts and Science in Archaeology and Information Studies.

Career 
Kwaku after graduating from the University of Ghana set up an idea company Checkmates, which provided marketing and business ideas services. He evolved from writing movie scripts into designing clothes after encountering Mr Philip Ayesu of GM Multiproconcepts and the CEO of XMEN Grooming through Checkmates.

He founded the fashion company, Chocolate Clothes which started operating as a clothing line for women in March 2013 but grew into a men's wear and accessories brand and later got incorporated in 2018. Although starting the clothing brand as a single-handedly operated business, Kwaku in recent times has unveiled that the growing fashion house is now capable of handling 1000 orders a month. Chocolate does not only design clothes but also manages the production of custom-made shoes and sandals.

The name Chocolate according to Kwaku is meant to drive more interest and craving in people towards his products, a revelation he made in an interview with CNN on African Start-up.

Works  
Kwaku won the best fashion designer of the year award during the 2018 EMY Africa Awards. He also won the maiden edition of Tailored African Fashion 2018, a project by Roberta Annan and African Fashion Fund in collaboration with Joy FM. His winning package comprised a flight to Paris as a speaker for the Change Now Summit as well as a visit to the French fashion house and luxury retail company, Louis Vuitton where he was to acquaint himself with Paris’ lavish products and brands. Through the African Fashion Fund, designs by Chocolate Clothes were featured in the Paris Fashion Week too.

Chocolate again clothed the Black Stars of Ghana during the 2014 world cup.

Chocolate has been featured in the Congo Airways magazine, CNN African Voices in January 2016, Vogue Magazine in 2017 and BBC radio in 2018.

Designs by Chocolate were among the works of designers displayed at the banquet held by the President of Ghana in honour of His Royal Highness, the Prince of Wales and his wife Camilla Duchess of Cornwall during their five-day state visit in November 2018. Chocolate Clothes’ designs were showcased at the Fashion for Peace show in Paris, organized by the EU, African Fashion Fund, UN ITC-EFI and Ethical Fashion.

Chocolate designs have been displayed at fashion shows including Radiance Fashion Show and Glitz Africa Fashion Week.

Celebrities such as Steve Harvey, Jamie Foxx, T.I, Cardi B, Jack Dorsey, Nasty C, Mr Eazi, Black Boy of GhOne, Majid Michel, Joe Mettle, M.anifest and Kwabena Kwabena patronize Chocolate Clothing. Jussie Smollett, better known as Jamal Lyon from Empire wore a piece by Chocolate Clothing in his music video Hurt People.

Personal life 
Kwaku is married to Melissa Owusu, the founder of the make-up brand, Aquia.

References 

Living people
Ghanaian fashion designers
University of Ghana alumni
1986 births
Alumni of Achimota School